Sheu Yuan-dong (22 May 1927 – 16 February 1998) was a Taiwanese politician who served as the 15th governor of Taiwan's central bank from 1995 until his death in 1998. Born in then-Japanese-occupied Taiwan, Sheu attended Taipei City Success High School and graduated from the Department of Political Science at the National Taiwan University. He held senior positions in Taiwan's financial sector. On 16 February 1998, he was killed in the crash of China Airlines Flight 676 along with his wife, Huang Mian-mei, and three other officials of the central bank.

Life and career 
Sheu Yuan-dong was born on 22 May 1927 in Shinchiku Prefecture. Four months after his birth, he and his family moved to Taipei to make a living. In 1935, he attended Longshang public School No. In 1941, he attended the Taipei State Second Middle School. In October 1945, he was admitted to the National Taiwan University. In October 1946 he entered the Political Department of the Taiwan University Law School. In January 1947, in response to the Shen Chong case, students from Taiwan University and Peking University held anti-American demonstrations in Taipei, which Sheu participated in. After the outbreak of the February 28 incident the same year, the Secrecy Bureau arrested college students and intellectuals, while Sheu took refuge in Yilan City and Yingge District. Sheu attended the reading club during the political department of the National Taiwan University. In May 1950, he was sent to the freshman corps in present-day Neihu District and was released in March 1951. In October of the same year, Sheu was re-educated at Taiwan University and graduated in June 1952.

In 1954, Sheu and former Taiwanese president Lee Teng-hui, now the chief justice of the court, Hong Xunxin, late businessman Qiu Yonghan, and other Taiwanese elites were hired to teach at the Taipei Private Yan Ping High School.

Sheu entered the Taiwan Provincial Cooperation Treasury Hualien Branch in 1953 as a clerk. In 1954, he served as a clerk in the Research Office of the Cooperative Treasury Head Office. In 1959, he was the Planning Director of the Cooperative Treasury Savings Department. In 1968, he was the assistant manager of the treasury and the Ministry of Agriculture and Credit. In 1974, he cooperated. Deputy General Manager of Jinku, the general manager of the Land Bank in 1979 and the general manager of the First Bank in 1980. In 1982, he served as the Finance Director of the Ministry of Finance. In 1984, he served as Chairman of the Land Bank. In 1989, he served as Chairman of the Banking Association. In January 1990, he served as a member of the Central Bank and became Chairman of the Bank of Taiwan in July 1995.

Sheu became the governor of the Central Bank of the Republic of China on 20 March 1995, succeeding Liang Kuo-shu, who resigned due to health problem and died later the same year. The 1997 Asian financial crisis affected many Asian countries, but did not seriously affect Taiwan. The financial community believed that it was the president’s operator.

Death 
On 16 February 1998, Sheu, Chen Huang and other senior officials of the central bank's foreign exchange bureau flew to Bali, Indonesia to attend the annual meeting of the Presidents Association of the Central Bank of Southeast Asia. They boarded China Airlines Flight 676 for their return trip to Taipei's Chiang Kai-shek International Airport. Flight 676 crashed during final approach due to pilot error, killing all 196 people on board including Sheu, as well as seven more people on the ground. Lee Teng-hui, the president of Taiwan at the time, instructed Perng Fai-nan to take over as governor of the central bank.

During Sheu Yuan-dong’s tenure as governor of the central bank, Qiu Zhengxiong, the vice president of the central bank, was the former vice president of the Executive Yuan.

Legacy 
On February 16, 2008, the tenth anniversary of Sheu Yuan-dong's death, many Taiwanese financial leaders invited the Alban Berg Quartett, who had a good relationship with Sheu, to Taiwan. A remembrance concert was held for Sheu on 14 May 2008.

Biographical publishing 
On 3 October 2010, Sheu Yuan-dong's biography was published. It was written by Sheu's daughter Sheu Chiu-chen and senior journalist Lu Shih-hsiang. The book reveals his resentment of a "foreign regime" and his belief in Taiwanese independence, saying:

In addition, Sheu also criticized Vincent Siew, the then-president of the Executive Yuan, for his handling of the 1997 Asian financial crisis. He also expressed concern when finance minister Wang Chien-shien opened a private bank in 1990.

References

External links 
認識央行歷任首長 [Know the central bank’s successive heads] (in Chinese)
許遠東先生暨夫人紀念文教基金會 [Mr. and Mrs. Sheu Yuan-dong Memorial Cultural and Educational Foundation] (in Chinese) (Archive)
延平學院能否從二二八悲情中重生？ [Can Yanping College be reborn from the tragic situation of 228?] (in Chinese) (Archive)

1927 births
1998 deaths
Taiwanese bankers
Governors of the Central Bank of the Republic of China
Victims of aviation accidents or incidents in 1998
Victims of aviation accidents or incidents in Taiwan
National Taiwan University alumni